C. mortuorum may refer to:
 Cocytius mortuorum, a hawkmoth species in the genus Cocytius
 Cynomya mortuorum, a fly species

See also
 Mortuorum